Max Keeble's Big Move is a 2001 American comedy film directed by Tim Hill, written by David L. Watts, James Greer, Jonathan Bernstein and Mark Blackwell and starring Alex D. Linz, Larry Miller, Jamie Kennedy, Nora Dunn, and Robert Carradine. The plot follows the eponymous Max and his friends, who begin going to junior high school only to learn Max and his family will soon move elsewhere; Max resolves to get even with those who bully him and his friends before he leaves since he will not remain long enough to face discipline for anything he does.

The film was released in the United States on October 5, 2001 by Walt Disney Pictures. It received mixed reviews from critics and grossed $18 million against its $25 million budget.

Plot
Max Keeble is a paperboy who starts his first day of middle school. Max is antagonized by the corrupt megalomaniacal school principal, Elliot T. Jindrake, resident school bullies Troy McGinty and Dobbs, and the Evil Ice Cream Man. Max also learns that an animal shelter he visits next door to the school is being closed down to build Jindrake's opulent football stadium.

When Max's father, Donald, reveals that he is moving to Chicago for his boss, because he is unable to stand up for himself, Max realizes that he can do whatever he wants to his tormentors, facing no consequences because he will be gone by then. Enlisting his equally socially outcast friends, Robe and Megan, Max sets up a variety of pranks, which include traumatizing Troy by playing the main theme song of the children's television show MacGoogles the Highlander Frog (which frightened him as a child), then trapping him in the gym with someome wearing a MacGoogles costume; instigating a fight between Dobbs and the Evil Ice Cream Man by stealing the coolant coil for the ice cream truck and Dobbs's handheld device; and ruining Jindrake's chances of becoming successor to the current superintendent, Bobby "Crazy Legs" Knebworth (an alumnus who was a star football player for the school) by planting animal pheromones within his breath spray, instigating a food fight in the cafeteria in view of Superintendent Knebworth, and later by sabotaging his TV announcements by placing a cardboard cutout of Max mocking him.

After his missions are completed, Max ends up ditching Robe and Megan's going-away party by accepting an invitation to a milkshake party hosted by his crush Jenna, causing a falling-out. Robe tells Max how Megan really feels about him, and then walks away telling Max that he hopes he enjoys his new life in Chicago. Max then calls Megan's house, telling her mom to relay to her that he is sorry for what happened. Taking Max's earlier advice to heart, Donald announces that he quit his job and started his own business, meaning that Max is not moving after all. Max freaks out at this news, and learns that other students at his school are suffering because of his actions.

Max confronts Jindrake, Troy, and Dobbs one final time, and with the help of other students at his school, Max eventually defeats Troy and Dobbs for good by throwing them into the dumpster with his schoolmates' help and stops Jindrake from demolishing the animal shelter. Jindrake is dismissed and facing criminal charges for manipulating the school budget in order to build his stadium after Max tricked him into publicly admitting to his crimes earlier.

The film ends when Max rides on his bicycle delivering newspapers around his neighborhood, and the Evil Ice Cream Man starts pursuing him once again.

Cast
 Alex D. Linz as Max Keeble
 Larry Miller as Principal Elliot T. Jindrake, the corrupt principal.
 Jamie Kennedy as the Evil Ice Cream Man, an unnamed ice cream vendor who plans revenge on Max ever since the latter found a bug in a snow cone and his mother called the health department on him.
 Nora Dunn as Lily Keeble, Max's mother.
 Robert Carradine as Donald Keeble, Max's father.
 Josh Peck as Robe, the robe-wearing friend of Max.
 Zena Grey as Megan, Max's female friend.
 Noel Fisher as Troy McGinty, one of Max's bullies.
 Orlando Brown as Dobbs, one of Max's bullies who gets into a feud with the Evil Ice Cream Man whenever Dobbs poaches his customers.
 Brooke Anne Smith as Jenna, the love interest of Max.
 Myra Ambriz as Chelsea
 Justin Berfield as Caption writer
 Clifton Davis as Bobby "Crazy Legs" Knebworth, a former football player and the superintendent of the school district that Max's school is in.
 Amy Hill as Ms. Phyllis Rangoon, Principal Jindrake's secretary.
 Amber Valletta as Ms. Nicole Dingman
 Dennis Haskins as Mr. Kohls
 Chely Wright as Mrs. Styles, the Homeroom Teacher.

Cameos
 Tony Hawk as himself
 Lil' Romeo as himself
 Marcus Hopson as Pizza parlor guy

Reception

Box office
Max Keeble's Big Move grossed $17.3 million in the United States and Canada and $1.3 million in other territories for a worldwide total of $18.6 million, against a production budget of $25 million.

The film grossed $5.4 million in its opening weekend, finishing 7th at the box office.

Critical response
On review aggregator website Rotten Tomatoes, the film has an approval rating of 29% based on 56 reviews, and an average rating of 4.31/10. The site's critical consensus reads: "Max Keeble may be fun for kids, but bland and unoriginal for adults." On Metacritic, which assigns a normalized rating, the film has a score 40 out of 100, based on 19 critics, indicating "mixed or average reviews". Audiences polled by CinemaScore gave the film an average grade of "B" on an A+ to F scale.

References

External links

 
 
 
 
 

2001 films
2000s children's comedy films
American children's comedy films
Walt Disney Pictures films
Films directed by Tim Hill
Films scored by Michael Wandmacher
Films set in California
Films about bullying
Films about educators
Films about pranks
American films about revenge
2001 comedy films
Middle school films
2000s English-language films
2000s American films